Tribute to Tradition is a 1998 American tribute album released in 1998 via Columbia Records Nashville. The album mainly consists of cover songs of country songs from the 1950s through the 1970s, as done by then-contemporary country music artists.

Content
"Same Old Train", the only song on the album which is not a cover, charted at number 59 on Billboard Hot Country Songs in 1998. The song won the 1999 Grammy Award for Best Country Collaboration with Vocals.

Joe Diffie's rendition of Charlie Rich's "Behind Closed Doors" also charted at number 64, and Doug Stone's cover of Steve Wariner's "Gone Out of My Mind" peaked at number 48. The album was intended as a fundraiser for a retirement center in Nashville, Tennessee.

Critical reception
Jana Pendragon of AllMusic rated the album four out of five stars. Although she criticized Joe Diffie and Collin Raye's vocal performance on "Honky Tonk Heroes Like Me" and Mary Chapin Carpenter's on "Oh Lonesome Me", she praised the album for the variety of artists and thought that "Same Old Train" was a "grand finale". Joel Bernstein of Country Standard Time gave the album a mostly positive review, as he thought the album had potential to introduce country music standards to a more contemporary audience.

Track listing

Chart performance

References

1998 albums
Country albums by American artists
Columbia Records albums
Tribute albums